The Last Mile is a Broadway play by John Wexley that ran for 289 performances from February 13, 1930, to October 1930 at the Sam H. Harris Theatre. It was produced by Herman Shumlin and staged by Chester Erskine. It is set in the death row wing of a prison. The lead role of John "Killer" Mears was first played by Spencer Tracy, and it was the role that brought him to the attention of Hollywood. It was later played for a time by Clark Gable on tour. The play was adapted into a 1932 film starring Preston Foster and into a 1959 film starring Mickey Rooney.

Cast
 Howard Phillips as Fred Mayor
 James Bell as Richard Walters
 Hale Norcross as "Red" Kirby
 Ernest Whitman as Vincent Jackson
 George Leach as Eddie Werner
 Don Costello as Drake
 Spencer Tracy as John Mears
 Herbert Heywood as O'Flaherty
 Orville Harris as Peddie
 Ralph Theodore as Principal Keeper Callahan
 Richard Abbott as Harris
 Joseph Calleia as Tom D'Amoro
 Henry O'Neill as Father O'Connors
 Clarence Chase as Evangelist
 Bruce MacFarlane as Frost
 Albert West as Brooks

Adaptations

The Last Mile was adapted for a 1932 feature film directed by Samuel Bischoff. The film took a number of liberties with the original story, toning down its grim realism and shifting the emphasis from Killer Mears (Preston Foster) to Richard Walters (Howard Phillips).

A 1959 adaptation starring Mickey Rooney as Mears was directed by Howard W. Koch.

References

External links

 

1930 plays
American plays adapted into films
Plays set in Oklahoma